Lakeview Public Schools is a school district headquartered in St. Clair Shores, Michigan, United States.

Schools

Secondary schools
 Lakeview High School
 Jefferson Middle School

Primary schools
 Ardmore Elementary School
 Greenwood Elementary School
 Harmon Elementary School
 Princeton Elementary School
 Salturelli Preschool Program

References

External links
 

School districts in Michigan
Education in Macomb County, Michigan